Combat Logistics Battalion 26 (CLB-26) is a logistics battalion of the United States Marine Corps. They are part of Combat Logistics Regiment 2 and the 2nd Marine Logistics Group. The unit is based out of the Marine Corps Base Camp Lejeune, North Carolina and is in direct support of the 26th Marine Expeditionary Unit (26th MEU) .

Mission
Provide timely, reliable, and continuous combat logistics support to all elements of the 26th MEU.

Subordinate units
 Engineer Platoon
 Explosive Ordnance Disposal
 Landing Support Platoon
 Maintenance Platoon
 Health Service Support Platoon
 Motor Transportation Platoon
 Supply Platoon
 Distribution Liaison Cell

History

See also

 List of United States Marine Corps battalions

External links
 CLB-26's official website
 Official Public Website Home Page – Combat Logistics Battalion 26

CLB26